Harold Fitzroy Collocott (25 June 1883 – 12 September 1955) was an Australian rules footballer who played with Geelong in the Victorian Football League (VFL).

Notes

External links 

1883 births
1955 deaths
VFL/AFL players born outside Australia
Australian rules footballers from Victoria (Australia)
Geelong Football Club players
People educated at Geelong College